Victor Marius Prus (Mińsk Mazowiecki (Poland), 24 April 1917 – Montreal, 21 January 2017) was a Polish-born Canadian architect. He designed several major buildings in Quebec which won many prizes, such as the Grand Théâtre de Québec in Quebec City; his designs were chosen from those of several entries in a national competition in 1964. With his wife Maria Fisz Prus and many collaborators, he designed buildings remarkable for their characteristic and appropriate "ambiance", which, according to Prus, was the "ultimate objective" of architecture.

His principal completed commissions include:
 The first Rockland Centre Mall, Montreal (1960)
 Savoy Apartments, Montreal (1962) 
 Mont-Royal metro station, Montreal (1966)
 Autostade, Montreal (1966), with Maurice Desnoyers
 St. Augustine's Church, Saint-Bruno-de-Montarville (1966-1967)
 Royal Canadian Air Force Memorial at the National Air Force Museum of Canada in Trenton, Ontario (1969)
 The Grand Théâtre de Québec (1964–70)
 Conservatoire de musique du Québec (1971)
 The Canada–France–Hawaii Telescope (CFHT) at Mauna Kea, Hawaii (1977)
 The rebuilt Place Longueuil Mall, Longueuil (1981)
 Barbados International Airport
 The Palais des Congrès (Convention Centre) in Montreal (1979–83)

References

External links 
Quelques réalisations architecturales de Victor Prus et Ian Martin
Finding aid for the Victor Prus fonds, 1945-1992, Canadian Centre for Architecture (digitized items)

1917 births
2017 deaths
Brutalist architecture
Canadian architects
People from Mińsk Mazowiecki
Polish emigrants to Canada